Michael Holz (born 10 April 1975) is a professional German darts player, he's currently playing in Professional Darts Corporation events.

Holz first qualified for a PDC European Tour in 2016, when he qualified for the 2016 International Darts Open, defeating Michael Barnard in the first round, before losing to eventual champion Mensur Suljović in the second round, and the 2016 German Darts Championship, losing to Ron Meulenkamp in the first round.

References

External links

Living people
German darts players
Professional Darts Corporation associate players
1975 births